Spring Reverb is the third studio album released by the rock and roll jam band The Big Wu.  This was the last album recorded with former member Jason Fladager before he departed the band.

Track listing
  "Break of Day" 
  "SPMC" 
  "Make Believers" 
  "Chateau in the Know" 
  "Flat Iron Suite" 
  "Dancing with Lula" 
  "Rhode Island Red" 
  "Irregular Heartbeat" 
  "Tequila" 
  "Recipes" 
  "Shoot the Moon" 
  "Bird on the Wing" 
  "Southern Energy"

2002 albums
The Big Wu albums